Stephen Charles Fonyo Jr. (June 29, 1965 – February 18, 2022) was a Canadian runner with an artificial leg who was a nationally renowned fundraiser for cancer research and treatment, and a former Member of the Order of Canada.

Journey for Lives
At age 12, Fonyo's left leg was amputated above the knee to prevent the spread of bone cancer. He left school in grade 10 to work in a lawnmower and chainsaw shop. 

At age 18, he embarked on a run across Canada entitled Journey for Lives to raise funds for cancer research. In doing so, he followed in the footsteps of Terry Fox. Fonyo began his run on March 31, 1984 and completed it 425 days later on May 29, 1985, covering  and raising $14 million. Unlike Fox, who had to abandon the Marathon of Hope when his cancer returned, Fonyo completed the coast-to-coast run. He also completed a run across the United Kingdom.

He was named a Member of the Order of Canada in 1985, the youngest person ever given that status at the time. This achievement was marred by grief, as his father Steve Fonyo Sr. died of lung cancer the same year.

Later life and legal troubles
At some point Fonyo began abusing alcohol and drugs. He repeatedly ran afoul of the law, and was charged and convicted of various crimes.

In 1996, Fonyo pleaded guilty to 16 charges for offences in Edmonton, including assault with a weapon, aggravated assault, fraud for writing bad cheques totalling $10,000 to supermarkets, and possession of a stolen vehicle. He was also convicted at least five times of impaired driving, and seven times of driving without a licence, most recently in the fall of 2008. On August 13, 2009, Fonyo, last known to have been working as a heavy-machinery mechanic, appeared in BC Provincial Court in Surrey charged with one count of assault. He pleaded guilty and was sentenced to one day in jail. He was credited for ten days already served. He was also subject to a one-year probation order. But just five days later, the 44-year-old was back in court, having breached his conditions. He pleaded guilty and was sentenced to 14 days in jail.

His membership in the Order of Canada was revoked on December 10, 2009. On January 27, 2010, Fonyo gave a brief telephone interview to CTV News from the Surrey Remand Centre, where he was serving the balance of his sentence on an assault charge after breach of his parole. Fonyo stated it was wrong to have his Order of Canada revoked, as it was given to him for something he had previously done.

On August 6, 2010, he was again arrested for fraud. On August 28, 2010, Fonyo married Lisa Greenwood.

On December 7, 2010, Fonyo pleaded guilty to threatening Greenwood and to unrelated charges of fraud, credit card fraud, and driving with a suspended licence.

In February 2015, friends and family reported to news media that Fonyo was in an induced coma in Royal Columbian Hospital after being stabbed by three home invaders at his residence in Whalley, a neighbourhood of Surrey. Doctors placed Fonyo in a medically induced coma for a month after the attack. Fonyo ended up having a traumatic brain injury, which led to him being prescribed medication to prevent possible seizures.

Death and legacy
While in the Vancouver area to have repairs made on his prosthetic foot, Fonyo died in a Burnaby hotel room, just after midnight on February 18, 2022, at the age of 56. Fonyo's partner since 2015, Lisa Marie Herbert, believed he had had a seizure, which his ex-wife thought was related to his traumatic brain injury. The cause of death is still awaiting an examination by the coroner.

Steve Fonyo Drive in Kingston, Ontario, is named after him, as is Steve Fonyo Beach in Victoria, British Columbia, where he ended his run and where he was later married in 2010. Fonyo Road was also named in Prince Albert, Saskatchewan.

In 2015, Fonyo was the subject of Alan Zweig's documentary film Hurt which covered Fonyo's decline into addiction and homelessness. It won the Platform Prize at the 2015 Toronto International Film Festival and the 2015 Canadian Screen Award for Best Feature Length Documentary Zweig followed up Hurt with the sequel Hope, released  in 2017.

Film producer and screenwriter Greg Klymkiw, who wrote an open letter calling for Fonyo to be reinstated into the Order of Canada, said “I was frankly appalled that some persnickety pencil-pushers in the governor-general’s office would have chosen to rescind this great honour for something absolutely amazing that Steve did at the age of 19. They looked at 30 years of Steve’s (post-marathon) life when he was suffering from depression, mental illness and addiction, and essentially, because he was ill, they used this against him".

Hamilton Spectator sports columnist Scott Radley wrote "Yet at a time we’re supposed to be more enlightened about addiction and possibly mental health problems, the near-complete purge of Fonyo from the public narrative somehow seems unfair. Especially when you wonder if this would’ve happened to him had he not faced the pressures of fame and expectations he was obviously ill-equipped to handle. All in the pursuit of raising money for charity."

References

External links
 Whatever Happened To: Steve Fonyo 
 FactsCanada.ca, 2001 newsletter
 "Steve Fonyo", The Canadian Encyclopedia.

1965 births
2022 deaths
Anglophone Quebec people
Athletes from Montreal
Canadian amputees
Canadian disabled sportspeople
Canadian people convicted of assault
Canadian people of Hungarian descent
People convicted of fraud
People removed from the Order of Canada
Sportspeople from Surrey, British Columbia